Handball has been played consistently at the Mediterranean Games since the year 1967 for men except in 1971 and since the year 1979 for women except 1983. The Yugoslavian national handball team is the most successful men's team and the French women's national handball team is the most successful team for women.

Men's tournaments

 A round-robin tournament determined the final standings.

Men's medal table

Women's tournaments

Women's medal table

All-time medal table

Footnotes

External links 
 Mediterranean Games - Men's Handball (goalzz.com)
 Mediterranean Games - Women's Handball (goalzz.com)

 
Handball
Mediterranean Games
Mediterranean Games
Mediterranean Games
Mediterranean Games